Aji Ichiban  was one of the largest snack food franchises in Hong Kong, established in 1993 by Lai Chan Yuk Hing and Lai Hin Tai, which was the president and managing director, respectively. Despite having a hiragana syllabary no (の) in its name, Aji Ichiban was not a Japanese franchise. There were over 90 international locations in varying international destinations.

Product

Items sold vary by location and encompassed a wide range of flavors from both East Asian, Japanese and American cuisines, including beef jerky, dried apricots, Skittles, chocolates, nonpareils, spicy dried fish, plum tablets, chili olives, fried and shredded squid, shrimp crackers, hot dog and hamburger shaped gummy candies, wasabi peas, etc. In addition to providing products based on gustatory appeal, many Aji Ichiban shops carried items that have ties to traditional Eastern remedies.  The stores had small bowls of samples for most of the snack items - mainly dried fruit and seafood preparations - so that customers could taste the snacks before they bought them. The snacks were purchased by taking a bag and filling it up with food from the various stations, according to the cost. It was then weighed and you paid accordingly.

International locations

Canada

In Canada, Aji Ichiban had a store in Parker Place, an Asian shopping mall in Richmond, a suburb of Metro Vancouver, British Columbia. (now closed)

Philippines

In the Philippines, Aji Ichiban had several outlet-sized stores, most of which were in shopping malls.

Makati

 Power Plant Mall - Open
Glorietta 4 - Open

Mandaluyong

 SM Megamall Building A - Open

Manila City

 Robinsons Place Manila
 SM City Sta. Mesa

Pasay

 SM Mall of Asia

Quezon City

 Robinsons Galleria

San Juan

 Greenhills Shopping Center - Open

United States

In the United States, Aji Ichiban USA was founded in 2000 as an exclusive franchise, with several stores located throughout the United States. Many Chinese political leaders paid visits to these locations. However, as of 2013, most of the locations had been closed.

California

 San Jose/Cupertino - Closed
 Los Angeles
 Monterey Park - Open
 San Gabriel - Open
 San Francisco
 Chinatown - Closed

Illinois
 Chicago - Open

Hawaii
 Honolulu - Closed

Maryland
 Rockville - Closed

Massachusetts
 Boston - Closed

New York
New York City
 Broadway - Closed
 Centre Street - Closed
 Lafayette Street - Closed
 Mott Street - Closed
 Hester Street - Closed
 Main Street - Open

Pennsylvania
 Philadelphia - Closed

Texas
 Richardson - Closed

See also
 List of food companies

References

External links

 Aji Ichiban

Hong Kong brands
Food manufacturers of Hong Kong
Catering and food service companies of Hong Kong
1993 establishments in Hong Kong
2022 disestablishments in Hong Kong